Grant Sullivan may refer to:
 Grant Sullivan (cricketer) (born 1984), former Australian cricketer
 Grant Sullivan (actor) (1924–2011), American actor